Nimisha is an Indian feminine given name. It may refer to the following notable people:

Nimisha Madhvani, Ugandan diplomat
Nimisha Mehta, British actress
Nimisha Mukerji, Canadian film and television director
Nimisha Pandey, Indian television and Internet content developer and curator
Nimisha Sajayan,  Indian actress
Nimisha Suresh, Indian actress
Nimisha Suthar, Indian politician
Nimisha Vakharia,  Indian actress

Indian feminine given names